Peter Wilson Strader (November 6, 1818 – February 25, 1881) was an American politician who served one term as a U.S. Representative from Ohio from 1869 to 1871.

Biography 
Born in Shawnee, New Jersey, Strader moved with his parents to Lebanon, Ohio, in 1819.
He attended the common schools.
He worked in a printing office for three years.
He moved to Cincinnati, Ohio, in 1835.
Connected with the steamboat interests on the Ohio and Mississippi Rivers as a clerk and an engineer 1835–1848.
He served as general ticket agent of the Little Miami Railroad 1848–1867.

Congress 
Strader was elected as a Democrat to the Forty-first Congress (March 4, 1869 – March 3, 1871).
He was not a candidate for renomination in 1870.

Later career and death 
He resumed his former business interests.
He moved to Ashtabula, Ohio, in 1876, where he died February 25, 1881.
He was interred in Spring Grove Cemetery, Cincinnati, Ohio.

Sources

External links 
 

1818 births
1881 deaths
People from Lebanon, Ohio
Politicians from Ashtabula, Ohio
Burials at Spring Grove Cemetery
Politicians from Cincinnati
Democratic Party members of the United States House of Representatives from Ohio
19th-century American politicians
Republican Party members of the United States House of Representatives from Ohio